The Wigner–Seitz radius , named after Eugene Wigner and Frederick Seitz, is the radius of a sphere whose volume is equal to the mean volume per atom in a solid (for first group metals). In the more general case of metals having more valence electrons,  is the radius of a sphere whose volume is equal to the volume per a free electron. This parameter is used frequently in condensed matter physics to describe the density of a system. Worth to mention,  is calculated for bulk materials.

Formula
In a 3-D system with  free electrons in a volume , the Wigner–Seitz radius is defined by

where  is the particle density of free electrons. Solving for  we obtain

The radius can also be calculated as

where  is molar mass,  is amount of free electrons per atom,  is mass density, and
 is the Avogadro constant.

This parameter is normally reported in atomic units, i.e., in units of the Bohr radius.

See also
Wigner–Seitz cell
Wigner crystal

References

Atomic radius